Erin Entrada Kelly is an American writer of children's literature. She was awarded the 2018 John Newbery Medal by the Association for Library Service to Children for her third novel, Hello, Universe.

Kelly also received a 2021 Newbery Honor for We Dream of Space and the Award for Children's Literature from the Asian Pacific Librarians Association for her second novel, The Land of Forgotten Girls.

Her books are national and New York Times bestsellers and have been translated into many languages.

Early life and education 
Kelly was born in the United States and raised in Lake Charles, Louisiana, but now lives in New Castle County, Delaware, near Philadelphia, Pennsylvania. Her mother immigrated to the U.S. from the Philippines.

Kelly has a bachelor's degree from McNeese State University and a Master of Fine Arts from Rosemont College, where she teaches graduate-level courses in children's literature. She is also on the faculty of Hamline University, where she teaches in the Master of Fine Arts in Writing for Children and Young Adults program.

Career 
Kelly started her career as a journalist for the American Press and worked as an editor for Thrive Magazine for several years before relocating to the Northeast. Her debut novel, Blackbird Fly, was published by HarperCollins Greenwillow Books in 2015 and won a Golden Kite Award honor from the Society of Children's Book Writers and Illustrators and an honor award from APALA. She won the 2016 Children's Asian/Pacific American Awards for Literature for her second novel, The Land of Forgotten Girls. Kelly has also published numerous short stories for adults and worked as a book publicist with Smith Publicity in Cherry Hill, NJ. 
 
Kelly's third novel, Hello, Universe — the story of a missing middle-school boy and the group of friends who set out to rescue him  — received the 2018 Newbery Medal, among other honors.

Kelly is also the author and illustrator of the Maybe, Maybe Marisol Rainey series.

Kelly has cited Judy Blume as her greatest influence.

Awards and recognition 

 APALA Honor Award, Blackbird Fly
 Cybils Honor Award, Blackbird Fly
Golden Kite Honor Award, Society for Children's Book Writers and Illustrators, Blackbird Fly 
 Pat Conroy Southern Book Prize finalist, The Land of Forgotten Girls
 Dorothy Canfield Fisher Book Award finalist, The Land of Forgotten Girls
 Deutscher Jugendliteratur Preis, Hello, Universe
 Newbery Medal, Hello Universe
 Texas Bluebonnet Award Master List, Hello, Universe
 South Carolina Book Award Nominee, You Go First
 Bluestem Book Award Nominee, You Go First
 Mythopoeic Award Finalist for Best Fantasy Novel for Children, Lalani of the Distant Sea
 New York Public Library Best Books of the Year, Hello, Universe, Lalani of the Distant Sea, We Dream of Space
 Chicago Public Library Best Books of the Year, Hello, Universe, We Dream of Space
 Newbery Honor, We Dream of Space

Selected works 
 Blackbird Fly (2015) 
 The Land of Forgotten Girls (2016) 
 Hello, Universe (2017) 
 You Go First (2018) 
Lalani of the Distant Sea (2019) 
We Dream of Space (2020) 
Maybe Maybe Marisol Rainey (2021) 
Those Kids from Fawn Creek (2022) 
Surely Surely Marisol Rainey (2022)

References

External links

American writers of Filipino descent
American children's writers
Living people
Newbery Medal winners
21st-century American women writers
McNeese State University alumni
Rosemont College alumni
People from Lake Charles, Louisiana
Year of birth missing (living people)